Isella Glacier is in Wenatchee National Forest in the U.S. state of Washington, on the south slopes of Bonanza Peak, the tallest non-volcanic peak in the Cascade Range.

See also
List of glaciers in the United States

References

Glaciers of the North Cascades
Glaciers of Chelan County, Washington
Glaciers of Washington (state)